Ryskuzhino (Rısquja) is a rural locality (a village) in Amangildinsky Selsoviet, Abzelilovsky District, Bashkortostan, Russia. The population was 453 as of 2010. There are 7  streets.

Geography 
Ryskuzhino is located 19 km west of Askarovo (the district's administrative centre) by road. Kazmashevo is the nearest rural locality.

References 

Rural localities in Abzelilovsky District